Joey Carbone is a composer, music producer, arranger, keyboardist, vocalist, advisor and educator. He was born and raised in Brooklyn, New York.

Early life
When he was 16, Carbone was signed as a singer in a band to Atlantic Records by one of Atlantic's founders, Jerry Wexler. Carbone took a summer job working at Atlantic, where he watched recording sessions by Aretha Franklin, The Rascals, Cream, and The Rolling Stones.

Career overview
Carbone moved to Los Angeles and became a keyboardist and vocalist for recording sessions and concerts. He played keyboards for Kiki Dee & Elton John, Rick James, The Righteous Brothers, Eric Carmen, Rod Stewart, Cher, Air Supply, Andy Gibb, Bette Midler and others.

Carbone was the music director and theme composer for nine years for the television series Star Search.  He arranged, produced, conducted and played piano for then-budding performers Britney Spears, Christina Aguilera, Beyoncé, Alanis Morissette, LeAnn Rimes, Justin Timberlake and others. He won a Cable ACE Award for composing and producing the theme song for the series It's Garry Shandling's Show, on which he served as music director.

He composed and arranged music for China Beach, Falcon Crest, Entertainment Tonight, and others. He has also produced and/or composed albums for Japan-based record companies for American singers including Little Richard, Alyssa Milano, Joseph Williams and Bobby Kimball of Toto, Bill Champlin and Jason Scheff of the group Chicago, John O'Banion, Edward Furlong, Irene Cara, Zoom, Mylin, Neil Sedaka, Tiffany, Warren DeMartini (Ratt), The Righteous Brothers, and Sam Moore of Sam & Dave.
He has created more than 1,000 songs for the Japanese market including songs for KAT-TUN, Matsuura Aya, Smap, Wada Akiko, Crystal Kay, Akanishi Jin, Diana & the Treasures, Sexy Zone, Kanjani8, Tsuchiya Anna, Tackey & Tsubasa, N.E.W.S., Hey! Say! JUMP, Van Tomiko, Nakamori Akina, Nakayama Miho, Wink, Shonentai, Shibugakitai, Arashi, Aikawa Nanase, Mari Hamada, Lindberg, Inagaki Junichi, Koyanagi Yuki, Naomi Tamura, Infix, Julia Mazda, Eriko Tamura, and Masatoshi Ono. He has more than 80 Top 10 hits in Japan, and has composed hundreds of songs for Japanese television commercials, movies, and television programs, including the score for the film Satomi Hakken Den (Legend of the Eight Samurai).

Carbone is a contracted advisor to both Sony Records and Avex. He is a lecturer and international advisor at Jikei Gakuen (Tokyo School of Music and Dance). He has given lectures at colleges and universities in the United States, Japan, and Taiwan.

References

American male composers
21st-century American composers
Living people
American keyboardists
21st-century American male musicians
Year of birth missing (living people)